Sapana Sapana, also known as Sapna Punia (born 2 January 1988) is a female racewalker from Jaipur, Rajasthan, India. She competed in the Women's 20 kilometres walk event at the 2015 World Championships in Athletics in Beijing, China. She competed in the 20 km walk at the 2016 Summer Olympics in Rio de Janeiro, Brazil but did not finish. She set a national record in the 20 km walk at the 2015 National Games with at time of 1:40:35.70.

Punia is also a sub-inspector in the Rajasthan Police.

References

External links

Indian female racewalkers
Indian police officers
Living people
Athletes from Jaipur
Sportswomen from Rajasthan
1988 births
World Athletics Championships athletes for India
Olympic athletes of India
Athletes (track and field) at the 2016 Summer Olympics
21st-century Indian women
21st-century Indian people
Indian women police officers